Elections to Liverpool City Council were held on Monday 2 November 1896. One third of the council seats were up for election, the term of office of each councillor being three years.

After the election, the composition of the council was:

Election result

Ward results

* - Retiring Councillor seeking re-election

Comparisons are made with the 1895 election results, as the retiring councillors were elected in that year.

Abercromby

Breckfield

Brunswick

Castle Street

Dingle

Edge Hill

Everton

Exchange

Fairfield

Granby

Great George

Kensington

Kirkdale

Low Hill

Netherfield

North Scotland

North Walton

Prince's Park

Sandhills

St. Anne's

St. Domingo

St. Peter's

Sefton Park

South Scotland

South Walton

Vauxhall

Wavertree

West Derby

By-elections

No.20 Great George, 20 November 1896

Caused by the death of Councillor Simeon Smith (Liberal, Great George elected 1 November 1895) on 28 October 1896.

No. 4, Fairfield, 16 March 1897

Caused by the death of Councillor Thomas Hewitson (Conservative, Fairfield, elected 1 November 1895) on 6 February 1897.

No.10, Low Hill, 16 March 1897

Following a petition causing the election of Col. Charles Stewart Dean (Conservative)  on 2 November 1896 to be declared void.

See also

 Liverpool City Council
 Liverpool Town Council elections 1835 - 1879
 Liverpool City Council elections 1880–present
 Mayors and Lord Mayors of Liverpool 1207 to present
 History of local government in England

References

1896
1896 English local elections
1890s in Liverpool